The Art of the Engine Driver is a 2001 novel by Australian author Steven Carroll. It is the first in a sequence of novels written by Carroll, followed by The Gift of Speed and The Time We Have Taken. Inspired by a dream, the book was originally intended to be a stand-alone novel.

Awards

Prix Femina (France), Best Foreign Novel, 2005: shortlisted
Miles Franklin Literary Award, 2002: shortlisted

Reviews
"Light the Shade" weblog
Readings

References

2001 Australian novels
HarperCollins books
Novels set in one day